Naomi is an unincorporated community in Walker County, in the U.S. state of Georgia.

History
A post office called Naomi was established in 1856, and remained in operation until it was discontinued in 1904. The community took its name after a local church which was named for the biblical Naomi.

References

Unincorporated communities in Walker County, Georgia
Unincorporated communities in Georgia (U.S. state)